Timothy Joseph Ahearne (17 August 1885 – 12 December 1968) was an Irish track and field athlete who competed for the United Kingdom of Great Britain and Ireland in the 1908 Summer Olympics. He was born in Dirreen, Athea, Limerick and was the older brother of Dan Ahearn, the world record holder of the triple jump from 1909–1920.

Ahearne won the gold medal in the triple jump at the 1908 Summer Olympics held in London, while representing Great Britain and Ireland (as Ireland was not recognised separately at the time by the International Olympic Committee). He finished eight in the long jump competition and also participated in the standing long jump event but his result is unknown. In the 110 metre hurdles competition he was eliminated in the semi-finals.

After his Olympic victory in 1908, Ahearne emigrated to New York in 1909, and joined the Irish American Athletic Club. He also competed for time for the rival New York Athletic Club.

References

External links
Tim Ahearne's profile at Sports Reference.com
Winged Fist Organization

1885 births
1968 deaths
19th-century Irish people
Irish male triple jumpers
British male triple jumpers
British male long jumpers
British male hurdlers
Olympic athletes of Great Britain
Athletes (track and field) at the 1908 Summer Olympics
Olympic gold medallists for Great Britain
Sportspeople from County Limerick
Irish male long jumpers
Irish male hurdlers
Irish emigrants to the United States (before 1923)
Medalists at the 1908 Summer Olympics
Olympic gold medalists in athletics (track and field)